Ada Jafarey , often spelled Ada Jafri (22 August 1924 – 12 March 2015), was a Pakistani poet who is regarded as the first major female Urdu poet to be published and has been called "The First Lady of Urdu Poetry". She was also an author and was considered a prominent figure in contemporary Urdu literature. She received awards from the Government of Pakistan, the Pakistan Writers' Guild, and literary societies of North America and Europe in recognition of her efforts.

Life

Early life
Ada Jafarey was born on 22 August 1924, in Badayun, U.P. Her birth name was Aziz Jahan. Her father, Maulvi Badrul Hasan died when she was three, and her mother reared her. She started composing poetry when she was twelve years old, under the pen name of Ada Badayuni. She spent her early life within impassable social bounds.

Married life
She married Nurul Hasan Jafarey on 29 January 1947, in Lucknow, India. After her marriage, she took her pen name Ada Jafarey. Her husband, Nurul Hasan, was a top-ranking civil servant of the Federal Government of India. Ada Jafarey also moved with her husband to Karachi after the independence of Pakistan in 1947. Her husband was a littérateur himself who wrote columns for both English and Urdu newspapers. He also served as the president of the Anjuman-i Taraqqi-i Urdu. Nurul Hasan, a major inspiration to her writing, died on 3 December 1995.

Later life
She had been residing in Karachi, Pakistan. She used to frequently travel between Karachi and Toronto, playing an active role in promoting Urdu.

Family
Ada Jafarey and Nurul Hasan Jafarey had three children, Sabiha, Azmi and Aamir. Sabiha Jafarey is married to Zubair Iqbal and is settled in Potomac, Maryland, US. They have three children Sabah Iqbal, Yusuf Iqbal and Sameer Iqbal. Azmi Jafarey and his wife Shua Jafarey are now settled in Andover, Massachusetts, US. They have two sons, Faaez Jafarey and Aazim Jafarey. Ada Jafarey lived with her son, Aamir Jafarey, his wife, Maha Jafarey, together with their daughter Asra Jafarey in Karachi until her death. Ada Jafarey has two great-grandchildren, Sabine Rana and Rizwan Rana, children of Sabah Iqbal Rana and her husband Fawad Rana.

Death
Ada Jafarey died in the evening of 12 March 2015 in a hospital in Karachi where she was being treated, at the age of 90. The Pakistani Minister for  Information, Broadcasting and National Heritage, Pervez Rashid, the Governor of Sindh, Dr. Ishratul Ebad Khan, the Pakistani Prime Minister, Mian Nawaz Sharif, Dr. Muhammad Qasim Bughio, Chairman PAL, and Zahida Parveen, Director-General PAL, expressed sorrow over the death of Jafarey. They praised her work in the field of Urdu poetry and prayed for her soul. Her funeral prayer was held in Al-Hilal Mosque, Karachi. She was buried in the PECHS graveyard, Jamshed Town, Karachi on 13 March 2015.

Literary career

The first female poet
Ada Jafarey was part of a traditionally conservative society where women were not allowed to think and express independently. But she was bold enough to express herself. Despite having traditionality ingrained in her personality, she took part in modern art. As early as 1950, she was recognized as the First Lady of Urdu Poetry. Her mother, and her husband Nurul Hasan Jafarey, encouraged her to keep on her literary activities in spite of social difficulties. She was the student of great poets like Akhtar Sheerani and Jafar Ali Khan Asar Lakhnavi and used to get her poetry checked and corrected by them.

Style
Ada Jafarey writes in a gender-neutral mode, though her works include feminist themes like discrimination and dehumanisation of women and of them being viewed as sexual objects. Her personality seems absent from her poetry.

Ada Jafarey wrote of her experiences as a wife and mother in a modified traditional idiom, but also noticed the lack of fulfillment that accompanied these relationships.

Genre
She had mastered both genres of Urdu poetry,  and ghazal. In her ghazals, she took the pen name, .
She has also written a few .

Works
Ada Jafarey's first ghazal was published in Akhtar Sheerani's magazine, in 1945. Ada Jafarey published her first collection of poems, 
 in 1950. Her book, containing short essays with short biographies and brief commentaries on the work previous Urdu poets was published in 1987. Besides, she published five collections of Urdu poetry (and ), in addition to her autobiography, and forty research papers. She also published her collection of Urdu Haiku,  Her ghazal,  was sung and popularised by Ustad Amanat Ali Khan. The first couplet of that ghazal is:

Transliteration:

Awards
In 1955, Hamdard Foundation, New Delhi recognized her as the "Outstanding Female Poet of the Century". Later, she was awarded the Adamjee Literary Award by the Pakistan Writers' Guild in 1967 for her second poetic collection, . In recognition of her work, the Government of Pakistan awarded her the Medal of Excellence in 1981. She received the Baba-e Urdu, Dr. Maulvi Abdul Haq Award from the Pakistan Academy of Letters in 1994, and the Quaid-e Azam Literary Award in 1997. She was also the recipient of the 's Certificate of Merit. She was the recipient of various international awards from literary societies in North America and Europe.

The Government of Pakistan conferred upon her the Pride of Performance Award for Literature in 2003 (awards were announced on 14 August 2002). She was the recipient of the Kamal-e Fan Award for lifetime achievement in literature by the Pakistan Academy of Letters in 2003. She was the first woman recipient of the award since the literary prize was established by the Pakistan Academy of Letters (PAL) in 1997.

Feminist views
Ada Jafarey was a supporter of feminism. She expressed her views thus:

Critical reputation
Various critics say that Jafarey's poetry is full of politeness of expression. She combines both old and new thoughts in a unique artistic way through her poetry.

Qazi Abdul Ghaffar, in his introduction to Ada Jafarey's collection of verses, particularly mentioned her name in the field of feminist way of expression.

The Urdu poet and critic, Jazib Qureshi, said:"Ada Jafarey is the first and only lady poet who carries in her poetry the eternal colours of Ghalib, Iqbal, and Jigar."

See also

Ghazal
Fehmida Riaz
Kishwar Naheed
Parveen Shakir

Notes

External links
 — Download Ada Jafri's autobiography (in Urdu)

Citations

1924 births
2015 deaths
Pakistani women poets
Muhajir people
Urdu-language poets from Pakistan
Muslim poets
Pakistani Muslims
People from Karachi
Pakistani feminist writers
Recipients of the Pride of Performance
Recipients of Tamgha-e-Imtiaz
20th-century Pakistani poets
20th-century women writers
20th-century Pakistani women writers
Recipients of the Adamjee Literary Award
People from Budaun